Robert Neil Gamble (born 25 January 1995) is an English-born first-class cricketer who represented Loughborough MCC University, Leinster Lightning, Ireland 'A', Somerset County Cricket Club and Fremantle District Cricket Club (Western Australia). He plays club cricket for YMCA Cricket Club in Dublin, having previously played for Plumtree Cricket Club in Nottinghamshire. He made his First Class debut for Loughborough MCCU v Hampshire at the Rose Bowl on 2 April 2015, and his Twenty20 debut for Leinster Lightning in the 2017 Inter-Provincial Trophy on 26 May 2017. He made his List A debut for Leinster Lightning in the 2017 Inter-Provincial Cup on 4 June 2017.

References

External links
 

1995 births
Living people
Irish cricketers
People from Nottingham
Loughborough MCCU cricketers
Leinster Lightning cricketers